1986 saw many sequels and prequels in video games, such as Super Mario Bros. 2, along with new titles such as Arkanoid, Bubble Bobble, Castlevania, Dragon Quest, Ikari Warriors, The Legend of Zelda, Metroid, Out Run and R.B.I. Baseball. The year's highest-grossing arcade video games were Hang-On in Japan, Hang-On and Gauntlet in the United States, and Nemesis (Gradius) in London. The year's bestselling home system was the Nintendo Entertainment System (Famicom) for the third year in a row, while the year's best-selling home video games in Western markets were Super Mario Bros. in the United States and Yie Ar Kung-Fu in the United Kingdom.

Financial performance
In the United States, the home video game industry recovered with the arrival of the third generation of video game consoles led by the Nintendo Entertainment System (NES).

Highest-grossing arcade games

Japan
In Japan, the following titles were the highest-grossing arcade games of 1986, according to the Game Machine charts.

United Kingdom and United States
In the United Kingdom and United States, the following titles were the highest-grossing arcade video games of 1986.

Best-selling home systems

Best-selling home video games

Japan

According to Famicom Tsūshin (Famitsu) magazine, the following titles were the top ten best-selling 1985-1986 releases during the three-year sales tracking period between May 1986 (when Famitsu began tracking sales) and mid-1989.

The following titles were the best-selling home video games on the bi-weekly Famitsu charts in 1986. Famicom Tsūshin magazine began tracking sales from May 1986.

United Kingdom
In the United Kingdom, the following titles were the top ten best-selling home video games of 1986, according to the annual Gallup software sales chart. The top ten titles were all home computer games. The best-selling game was Yie Ar Kung-Fu, making it the second year in a row that a fighting game topped the annual charts, after The Way of the Exploding Fist in 1985.

United States
In the United States, Super Mario Bros. for the Nintendo Entertainment System (NES) was the best-selling home video game of 1986. The following titles were the best-selling home video games on the bi-weekly FAO Schwarz charts in 1986, reported by Famicom Tsūshin (Famitsu) magazine from June 1986 onwards.

Top-rated games

Major awards

Famitsu Platinum Hall of Fame
The following 1987 video game release entered Famitsu magazine's "Platinum Hall of Fame" for receiving a Famitsu score of at least 35 out of 40.

Business
New companies: Majesco Entertainment, Ubi Soft, Bethesda Softworks
Defunct: Imagic.
June 13 – Activision merges with Infocom.
Activision acquires Gamestar Software.
Sinclair Research Ltd. is acquired by Amstrad.

Notable releases
Arcade
February – Namco releases Sky Kid Deluxe, their first game to use a Yamaha YM2151 FM sound chip.
February – SNK releases Ikari Warriors, which shares many elements with Taito's Front Line from 1982, but adds two-player simultaneous play and visuals closer to 1985's Commando. It is SNK's breakthrough game in the US.
April – Sega releases Wonder Boy, the first in the series.
August – Taito releases Bubble Bobble.
July 8 – Namco releases The Return of Ishtar, which is the sequel to The Tower of Druaga.
July – Ten years after Atari's Breakout, Taito releases Arkanoid, which adds power-ups and unique levels and generally reinvigorates the concept.
September 20 – Sega releases the Out Run racing game.
October 1 – Namco releases Genpei Tōma Den.
December – Namco releases Rolling Thunder, distributed outside Japan by Atari Games.

Console
February 21 – Nintendo releases The Legend of Zelda (designed by Shigeru Miyamoto for the Family Computer Disk System), the first game in The Legend of Zelda series.
May 27 – Enix releases Dragon Quest for the Famicom, which is usually considered the foremost Japanese role-playing video game, and is the first game in a series that has been phenomenally successful in Japan.
June 3 – Nintendo releases Super Mario Bros.: The Lost Levels as the sequel to the Super Mario Bros.. The game was not released in North America, partially because it was deemed too difficult.
August 6 – Nintendo releases Metroid by Makoto Kano, the first in the Metroid series.
September 12 – Hudson Soft releases Adventure Island.
September 26 – Konami releases Akumajō Dracula for the Famicom Disk System, the first game in the Castlevania series.
November 1 – Sega releases Alex Kidd in Miracle World. It is the first game in the Alex Kidd series created for this character, and the most popular of all Alex Kidd games.
December 10 – Namco releases Pro Baseball: Family Stadium for the Famicom, the first in the Famista series.
December 19 – Nintendo releases Kid Icarus.

Computer
January 1 – Commodore releases Mind Walker for the Amiga. It keeps running, unmodified, on all versions of the Amiga hardware and OS.
May 6 – Infocom releases the highly regarded Trinity.
August 15 – Electronic Arts releases open-ended space exploration adventure game Starflight, which goes on to sell a million copies.
October – Sierra On-Line expands their "Quest" line with King's Quest III: To Heir Is Human and Space Quest I: The Sarien Encounter.
New World Computing releases Might and Magic Book One: The Secret of the Inner Sanctum for the Apple II, the first installment in the Might and Magic series.
Activision releases Labyrinth: The Computer Game. Developed by Lucasfilm Games, this is the first of the LucasArts adventure games.
Froggy Software releases La femme qui ne supportait pas les ordinateurs, one of the first video games about cyber harassment and female experience on the internet, and one of the first games with an overtly feminist message.

Hardware
September, Apple releases the final computer in the Apple II line, the 16-bit Apple IIGS with professional synthesizer-quality audio.
Namco releases the Namco System 86 arcade system board.
Atari Corporation releases:
The 1040ST personal computer, the second in the ST line. With a megabyte of RAM and a price of US$999, it is the first computer with a cost-per-kilobyte of under $1.
The Atari 7800 console two years after its original test market date.
A smaller model Atari 2600 for under US$50. The TV campaign proclaims "The fun is back!"
Sega releases the Master System console in the US.
Sharp releases the Twin Famicom home console only in Japan.
Nintendo releases the Family Computer Disk System (an add-on for the Famicom) in Japan only.
Texas Instruments releases the TMS34010, a CPU with graphics-oriented instructions. Eventually it powers arcade games such as Hard Drivin', Smash TV, Mortal Kombat, and NBA Jam.

See also
1986 in games

References

 
 
Video games by year
video games